Events from the year 1796 in Scotland.

Incumbents

Law officers 
 Lord Advocate – Robert Dundas of Arniston
 Solicitor General for Scotland – Robert Blair

Judiciary 
 Lord President of the Court of Session – Lord Succoth
 Lord Justice General – The Duke of Montrose
 Lord Justice Clerk – Lord Braxfield

Events 
 13 January – the Royal Technical College in Glasgow, predecessor of the University of Strathclyde, is founded under the will of Professor John Anderson.
 21 June – Scottish explorer Mungo Park becomes the first European to reach the Niger River.
 Formation of a reforming Whig party in Edinburgh under the leadership of lawyer Henry Erskine.
 Argyll Mausoleum at Kilmun Parish Church completed.
 Lodges of the Order of Free Gardeners inaugurated at Arbroath, Bothwell and Cumbnathan.

Births 
 25 January – William MacGillivray, naturalist (died 1852)
 20 April – George Gleig, soldier, military writer and priest (died 1888 in England)
 13 September – James Finlay Weir Johnston, chemist (died 1855)
 17 October – James Matheson, Member of Parliament and co-founder of Jardine, Matheson & Co. (died 1878)
 24 October – David Roberts, Orientalist landscape painter (died 1864 in London)
 unknown date – John Duncan, theologian and Hebraist (died 1870)

Deaths 
 13 January – John Anderson, natural philosopher and scientist (born 1726)
 12 February – John Hamilton, Member of Parliament for Wigtown Burghs and Wigtownshire (born 1715)
 17 February – James Macpherson, poet, "translator" of Ossian (born 1736)
 21 July – Robert Burns, poet (born 1759)
 6 August – David Allan, painter (born 1744)
 29 September – John Cunningham, 15th Earl of Glencairn, nobleman, cavalry officer and priest (born 1749)
 October – Thomas Christie, radical political writer (born 1761; died in Suriname)
 7 October – Thomas Reid, philosopher (born 1710)
 24 December – John Maclaurin, Lord Dreghorn, judge and poet (born 1734)

The arts
 21 July – death of the national poet, Robert Burns, in Dumfries, at the age of 37. His funeral (with honours as a military volunteer) takes place on 25 July while his wife, Jean, is in labour with their ninth child together, Maxwell. Burns is at first buried in the far corner of St. Michael's Churchyard in Dumfries. The volume of The Scots Musical Museum published this year includes his versions of "Auld Lang Syne" and "Charlie Is My Darling".
 26-year-old Walter Scott publishes his first work, the ballad "The Chase" – an English language translation of Gottfried August Bürger's Der Wilde Jäger.

References 

 
 Scotland
1790s in Scotland